A special election was held in  on October 15, 1802 to fill a vacancy left by the death of Charles Johnson (DR) on July 23, 1802.

Election results

Wynns took his seat on December 7, 1802.

See also
List of special elections to the United States House of Representatives

References

North Carolina 1802 08
North Carolina 1802 08
1802 08
North Carolina 08
United States House of Representatives 08
United States House of Representatives 1802 08